The Charles Grande House is a historic farmhouse in Albuquerque, New Mexico. It was built in 1915 by Charles Grande, an Italian immigrant who worked in the hotel and saloon business, and his wife Carmelita Garcia, who was from a New Mexico family. The Grandes operated a vineyard and raised livestock on the property, which was later subdivided for residential development in the 1950s. The building was added to the New Mexico State Register of Cultural Properties in 1983 and the National Register of Historic Places in 1984.

The house is a -story bungalow with a full-width screened porch. It has a broad gable roof with clapboarded gables and overhanging eaves supported by brackets. The house is in largely unaltered condition with original doors and sash windows throughout.

References

Houses in Albuquerque, New Mexico
Houses on the National Register of Historic Places in New Mexico
New Mexico State Register of Cultural Properties
National Register of Historic Places in Albuquerque, New Mexico